Georges de Layens (January 6, 1834 in Lille - October 23, 1897 in Nice) was a French botanist and apiculturalist. He was the creator of a popular mobile beehive called the "Layens hive". 

Layens was a member of the Académie des sciences. From 1869 to 1874, he lived in the Dauphiné Alps, where he established an apiary. Around 1877 he founded an apiary in Louye, Eure.

Published works 
He wrote or co-wrote a number of works on beekeeping and botany. With Gaston Bonnier (1853–1922), he was co-author of a book on apiculture called "Cours complet d'apiculture" and a publication on plants of northern France and Belgium titled "Nouvelle flore du Nord de la France et de la Belgique". Other publications associated with Layens include:
 Elevage des abeilles: par les procédés modernes pratique et théorie, 1882 - Beekeeping: modern procedures, practice and theory.
 Les abeilles: pratique de leur culture: miel, cire, hydromel, 1885 - Bees: their culture: honey, wax, mead.
 Le rucher illustre, erreurs à éviter et conseils à suivre, 1900 - Apiary through illustrations, mistakes to avoid and tips to follow.
 "Notice sur Georges de Layens (1834-1897)" by Gaston Bonnier.

References 

 Parts of this article are based on a translation of an equivalent article at the Spanish Wikipedia.

External links 
 Apiculture Populaire article on the Layens hive.

French beekeepers
19th-century French botanists
1834 births
1897 deaths
Beekeeping pioneers